The Battle of Bedcanford in 571 was a battle between the West Saxons and British that was a key part of the Anglo-Saxon settlement of Britain.

Anglo-Saxon Chronicle 
The battle was recorded in the Anglo-Saxon Chronicle, which was written about 250 years after the events:ASC 571.Her Cuþwulf feaht wiþ Bretwalas æt Bedcan forda. & .iiii. tunas genom, Lygeanburg. & Ægelesburg. Benningtun. & Egonesham. & þy ilcan geare he gefor.

This year Cuthwulf fought with the Britons at Bedford and took four towns, Limbury, Aylesbury, Benson and Eynsham. And this same year he died.
Cuthwulf was the son of Cynric, the king of Wessex. The four towns controlled the north bank of the Thames river from the Chilterns to the Cotswolds—roughly coinciding with the traditional counties of Buckinghamshire and Oxfordshire. It's possible that the Chiltern-setna, a 4,000-hide group listed in the Tribal Hidage, equate to the territory of these four towns.

Location of the battle 
The location of the Battle at Bedford, on the River Ouse and far to the east of the four towns that were captured, has been the source of debate for scholars. There is ample archaeological evidence of early Saxon and Anglian presence in the Midlands, and historians generally have interpreted Gildas's De Excidio as implying that the Britons had lost control of this area by the mid-sixth century. One possible explanation is that this annal records a reconquest of land that was lost to the Britons in the campaigns ending in the Battle of Badon.

References 

571
Bedcanford
Bedcanford
Bedcanford